Barni (Barhni) is a small village of Baliah Panchyat of Barsar District Hamirpur, Himachal Pradesh. 
According to Census 2011 information the location code or village code of Barni village is 017512. Barni village is located in Barsar Tehsil of Hamirpur district in Himachal Pradesh, India. It is situated 35 km away from district headquarter hamirpur. Barsar is the sub-district headquarter of Barni village.

The total geographical area of village is 39.96 hectares. Barni has a total population of 251 peoples. There are about 51 houses in Barni village. Barsar is nearest town to Barni.

The Barhni village has population of 251 of which 110 are males while 141 are females as per Population Census 2011.

In Barhni village population of children with age 0-6 is 32 which makes up 12.75% of total population of village. Average sex ratio of Barni village is 1282 which is higher than Himachal Pradesh state average of 972. Child sex ratio for the Barni as per census is 1286, higher than Himachal Pradesh average of 909.

Barhni village has higher literacy rate compared to Himachal Pradesh. In 2011,  literacy rate of Barni village was 91.78% compared to 82.80% of Himachal Pradesh. In Barni Male literacy stands at 98.96% while female literacy rate was 86.18%.

As per constitution of India and Panchayati Raj Act, Barni village is administrated by Sarpanch (Head of Village) who is elected representative of village.

In this village his own Mahila Mandal. Which is named as Shiv shakti Mahila Mandal Barni and Smt Santosh kumari w/o sh Keshav chand is the pradhan of Mahila Mandal.

Area
Total geographical area of village Barni, P.O Baliah Teh. Barsar District. Hamirpur(H.P) is approx 40 hectares.

Villages in Hamirpur district, Himachal Pradesh